Deforestation in Taiwan is the changes on the forested area in the island due to economy factors, such as agriculture, urban expansion etc. In 1904–2015, Taiwan has a net annual forest area change rate of 34 km2.

History
The changes in forest area of Taiwan is divided into several periods.

First period
The earliest documented period was the first period in 1904–1950, roughly coincided with the later stage of Japanese rule in Taiwan. In 1926, 64% of Taiwan's land was covered in forest. However, many new agricultural land were created in western lowland of Taiwan.

Second period
The second period which in 1956–1993, which coincided with the early era of Kuomintang government, saw a sharp increase in built-up area where it consumed forest areas around major big cities and towns. In 1989, the government issued a ban on the logging of primeval forests.

Third period
The third period in 1995–2015, saw major afforestation made and forested land reached its peak at 67% in 2010. Most of the afforestation were made on former agricultural land. Since 2008, companies, individuals and government bodies have jointly planted more than 230 km2 of trees.

See also
 Geography of Taiwan

References

Taiwan
Environment of Taiwan
Forestry in Taiwan